Daniel Sackey (born April 9, 1999) is a Canadian basketball player.

Personal
Sackey was born on April 9, 1999, in Winnipeg, Manitoba and is the son of Ghanaian immigrants.

College career
Sackey played for the 2020–21 Valparaiso Crusaders men's basketball team. In 2021, he transferred to New Orleans.

National team  
He was part of the Canadian squad that finished with a 6-1 record at the 2016 FIBA Under-17 World Championship. Sackey averaged 3.3 assists per game in the group phase, ranking him 7th among all players.

References

External links
Valpo Athletics Bio 
Profile at Sports-Reference.com
Profile at Usbasket.com

1999 births
Living people
Basketball players from Winnipeg
Canadian expatriate basketball people in the United States
Canadian men's basketball players
Canadian people of Ghanaian descent
New Orleans Privateers men's basketball players
Point guards
Valparaiso Beacons men's basketball players